"Free Your Mind" is a song by American female group En Vogue, released on September 24, 1992 as the third single from their critically acclaimed second album, Funky Divas (1992). The anti-prejudice song became a Top 10 hit on the Billboard Hot 100 and a Top 20 hit on the UK Singles Chart. Billboard named the song No. 41 on their list of "100 Greatest Girl Group Songs of All Time". The track was recorded between December 1991 and January 1992, composed and produced by Foster and McElroy. They were inspired by the Funkadelic song "Free Your Mind and Your Ass Will Follow." The guitar and bass tracks for the song were written and recorded by San Francisco-based guitarist Jinx Jones. The opening line: "Prejudice, wrote a song about it. Like to hear it? Here it go!", is adapted from a line originally used by David Alan Grier's character Calhoun Tubbs from Fox's In Living Color. An alternative version of the song with different lyrics appears on the 1992 Summer Olympics compilation album Barcelona Gold.

Commercial performance
"Free Your Mind" debuted at number 89 on the US Billboard Hot 100 the week of September 12, 1992. Within one week, it jumped to number 45, then to number 25, and continued to make impressive strides until it eventually peaked at number 8 the week of October 31, 1992. Altogether, "Free Your Mind" spent 16 weeks in the top 40 of the Billboard Hot 100. It reached the top twenty in the UK, where it was released as a double A-side single with "Giving Him Something He Can Feel".

Critical reception
Upon the release, Jennifer Bowles from Associated Press declared the song as a "plea for racial tolerance". Larry Flick from Billboard felt that it takes in "a more edgy direction" than in the past for the group. He remarked that placed "within a driving, guitar-anchored pop/rock setting, the group attacks well-crafted lyrics on racism with unrelenting passion and its trademark harmonies. Will jolt many at first, but will ultimately open many eyes." Dave Sholin from the Gavin Report commented, "Attacking prejudice head on, The Funky Divas offer advice to those who judge others by looks rather than action. Harmonies don't get any better than when these four incredible voices combine their talents." Connie Johnson from Los Angeles Times felt the song was a "pleasant surprise", "which confronts the prejudice even a funky diva faces, be it from store clerks--"I can't look without being watched!"—or those who don't understand that while they "might date another race or color, that doesn't mean I don't like my strong black brothers"." Pan-European magazine Music & Media noted that "the "Jackies" of all trades are breaking all the barriers in radio land", describing the song as "funk rock" and a "George Clinton cover as colourful as his dyed hair". 

Gerald Martinez from New Sunday Times called the song "storming", and said it "combines hard rock riffng with funk while En Vogue wail away with awesome power." Parry Gettelman from Orlando Sentinel wrote, "'Free Your Mind' owes a small lyrical debt to George Clinton and a large musical debt to LaBelle - not bad places from which to borrow. There's a brief, funny spoken intro that parodies an In Living Color sketch, and the quartet slams into a denunciation of prejudice of all sorts: "I might date another race or color/ Doesn't mean I don't like my strong black brothers"." A reviewer from People Magazine viewed it as a "the Pointer Sisters-meet-Van Halen rocker". Danyel Smith from Rolling Stone described it as "guitar-ravaged" Cheo H. Coker from Stanford Daily felt that En Vogue's "foray into rock 'n' roll [is] completely unsuited for the group, reminiscent of Janet Jackson's "Black Cat". While the song has great message, black rock is better left to the black rockers."

Retrospective response
In an 2017 retrospective review, Quentin Harrison from Albumism described "Free Your Mind" as "a searing rock number that challenged racism, sexism and other social phobias head on was all at once, smart, sexy and provocative." AllMusic's review critic, Jose F. Promis, voted the single very favorable and rated the Funky Divas album its highest rating at five. He also declared the track as a "hard rock smash". Another editor, Stephen Thomas Erlewine, described it as "swaggering". In his 2009 review, Daryl Easlea for BBC remarked that the song borrows from "heavy metal". In 2007, Laura Checkoway from Vibe called it a "rock-ish anthem with a George Clinton-lifted chorus".

Music video and other notable performances
The song is known for its innovative, award-winning music video, directed by Mark Romanek with production design by Nigel Phelps and art direction by Brad Hartmaier. On March 21, 1992, En Vogue performed "Free Your Mind" on Saturday Night Live for the first time to a positive reception.

On January 21, 1993, En Vogue performed the song on a sixth-season episode of the NBC sitcom A Different World, where they guest-starred as Vernon Gaines' nieces. It was certified gold by the Recording Industry Association of America in late 1992. It is one of several songs to feature all four members of the group on lead vocals.

Janet Jackson included the video in the Countdown of her twenty-five favorite videos of all-time at number eleven.

Track listings
 US CD single
 "Free Your Mind" (LP Edit) – 4:10
 "Just Can't Stay Away" – 5:11

 UK CD maxi single
 "Free Your Mind" (LP Edit) – 4:10
 "Giving Him Something He Can Feel" (LP Version) – 3:55
 "Free Your Mind" (Tommy's Spoiled Brat Edit) – 3:58
 "Time Goes On" (Dance Remix) – 5:45

 US CD maxi single
 "Free Your Mind" (Theo's Rec And Wreck Mix) – 5:41
 "Free Your Mind" (Tommy's Spoiled Brat Mix) – 5:00
 "Free Your Mind" (James' Club Mix) – 4:55
 "Free Your Mind" (Marley Marl Remix) – 5:27
 "Lies" (Eddie F Remix) – 5:43

Remix producers
Theo Mizuhara, Martin Van Blockson (UK CD Single)Theo Mizuhara, James Earley, Marley Marl, DJ Eddie F, Dave Hall (US CD Single)

Awards and nominations

Grammy Awards, 1993
 Best Rock Vocal Performance by a Duo or Group (nominated)
 Best Music Video, Short Form (nominated)

MTV Video Music Awards, 1993
 Video of the Year (nominated)
 Best Group Video (nominated)
 Best R&B Video (won)
 Best Dance Video (won)
 Viewer's Choice Award (nominated)
 Best Direction – Mark Romanek (nominated)
 Best Choreography – Travis Payne, Frank Gatson, and Lavelle Smith (won)
 Best Cinematography – Marc Reshovsky (nominated)

Charts and certifications

Weekly charts

Year-end charts

Certifications

Cover versions and other use

The Band covered the song on their 1996 album High on the Hog, and by Sub7even in 2002.

Japanese R&B duo Double recorded a cover of the song in 1995 and included it on their first remix album Crystal Planet.

The song was covered as part of a mash-up on Fox's Glee along with "Stop! In the Name of Love" by the Supremes in the episode "Never Been Kissed".

Swedish band Slapdash covered the song, track 13 on the album Actual Reality.

The song was used on the show Modern Family in an episode titled "Manny Get Your Gun" during a flash mob scene.

Greek pop star Elena Paparizou who performed a cover of the song at the first MadWalk by Vodafone on February 2, 2011 along with her smash hit single "Baby It's Over", dressed by Apostolos Mitropoulos.

The track has been included in Les Mills' most recent BodyVive class. The song was used in the trailer for the Seth Rogen comedy The Interview.

The song was used in the 1994 film The Cowboy Way.

A theme tune was used for an early series of Rory Bremner, Who Else in 1993 that bears a strikingly similar beat and guitar hook.

En Vogue recorded a second alternative version in 2017 for the Netflix shows Orange Is the New Black and GLOW.

The song was used in episode 10 of the sixth season of RuPaul's Drag Race All Stars during a lip-sync battle between Serena ChaCha and Jiggly Caliente.

The song was again used on episode 3 of the second season of Drag Race Holland during a lip-sync battle between The Countness and Ivy Elyse Munroe.

Acapella girl group Citizen Queen covered it in 2020. 

British girl-group Little Mix sang the chorus of "Free Your Mind" as the bridge during a rock rendition of their song "Woman Like Me" during their 2022 Confetti Tour.

See also
 1992 in music

References

External links
 En Vogue – Free Your Mind – Amazon.com
 "Free Your Mind" UK Maxi-Single-Discogs

1992 singles
1992 songs
American hard rock songs
En Vogue songs
Music videos directed by Mark Romanek
Songs against racism and xenophobia
Songs written by Denzil Foster
Songs written by Thomas McElroy
Song recordings produced by Foster & McElroy
East West Records singles